Man of the Moment is a 1955 British comedy film starring Norman Wisdom, Belinda Lee, Lana Morris and Jerry Desmonde. The film includes songs sung by the Beverley Sisters, including, "Dreams for Sale" (Arthur Groves, Peter Carroll), "Beware" (Norman Wisdom), "Yodelee Yodelay", and "Man of the Moment" (Jack Fishman).

Plotline
Norman, a file clerk in the (fictional) British Ministry of Overseas Affairs, becomes a British delegate to a diplomatic conference in Geneva, as there is no one else available. He accidentally votes against a motion that would allow intervention in the affairs of the (fictional) peaceful Pacific island nation of Tawaki. This earns him the gratitude of the Queen of Tawaki, who leaves all matters concerning her nation's future in the hands of 'Honourable Sir Norman'.

The furious governments, including America, Great Britain and the Soviet Union, which want to establish a military base on one of Tawaki's outlying islands, shower honours on Norman to persuade him to influence the Queen in their favour. One government sends a glamorous film star to seduce him before killing him, but fails in the attempt. He is then sent a parcel bomb, but he evades it. Finally, they kidnap his new girlfriend Penny. Norman chases the thugs through BBC studios, causing chaos in programmes being transmitted live.

Finally, Norman, now apparently an Ambassador, travels to Tawaki. As he addresses the Queen, a volcanic eruption completely destroys the island the governments had designs on.

Cast

Trivia
The television programmes interrupted by Norman chasing the thugs who kidnapped Penny comprise;

 a cookery session by Philip Harben, whose nearly-ready souffle is destroyed.
 A scene from The Grove Family, in which 'Granny Grove' trips up the thugs.
 Fabian of the Yard, in which 'Fabian' attempts to arrest them.
 A scene from a Greek drama is disrupted.

Production
It was Norman Wisdom's third film. Producer Hugh Stewart reportedly gave up the chance to make A Town Like Alice to do the film. It was one of several comedies Lee made at Rank.

Critical reception
 TV Guide noted, "some fine slapstick moments, including a television studio chase that interrupts several programs."
David Parkinson gave the film three out of five stars in the Radio Times, writing, "Norman Wisdom is almost at the peak of his powers in this typically silly comedy, in which, as ever, slapstick and sentiment jostle for centre stage....Although we usually think of Wisdom as a bashful bungler, he also did a nice line in cockiness, and it's surprisingly amusing to watch Whitehall and Geneva dance to his tune. Jerry Desmonde again provides supreme support as the stooge."

Box Office
The film was a huge hit in Hungary with over two million of the population of ten million going to see it. According to Kinematograph Weekly it was a "money maker" at the British box office in 1955.

References

External links
 
 
Man of the Moment at Letterbox DVD
Man of the Moment at BFI
  Man of the Moment available for free download at Internet Archive
Review of film at Variety

1955 films
1955 comedy films
British black-and-white films
Films directed by John Paddy Carstairs
Films set in Geneva
Films with screenplays by John Paddy Carstairs
Films shot at Pinewood Studios
British comedy films
Films about diplomats
1950s English-language films
1950s British films